Clube Desportivo Primeiro de Agosto is an Angolan men's basketball team based in Luanda. The team is part of the multi-sports club with the same name. The club is attached to the Angolan Armed Forces which is its main sponsor. The team competes at the local level at the Luanda Provincial Basketball Championship and at the BIC Basket. In the past, it has played in the Africa Basketball League competitions.

Primeiro de Agosto holds the record of titles won in the African Basketball Club Champions League with nine championships, its last one being in 2019.

History
In 2002, the club set an all-time Angolan record by winning all domestic and continental competitions, including the 2002 Angola Super Cup, the Angolan league, the Luanda provincial championship, the 2002 Angola cup and the 2002 FIBA Africa Champions Cup, without conceding a single defeat in the entire season.

In 2019, Primeiro won its record ninth African title after defeating AS Salé in Luanda.

Honours

Current roster

Staff

Former notable players

Head coaches

See also
C.D. Primeiro de Agosto (women's basketball)
Primeiro de Agosto Football
Primeiro de Agosto Handball
Primeiro de Agosto Volleyball
Primeiro de Agosto Roller Hockey
BIC Basket
Federação Angolana de Basquetebol

External links
 
Africabasket profile (Men)
SportStats profile
Facebook profile
Basketball blog

References

C.D. Primeiro de Agosto
Basketball teams established in 1977
Sports clubs in Angola
Basketball teams in Angola
1977 establishments in Angola